Cinematique 3 is the final in a series of three instrumental albums by Paul Haig, subtitled "Themes to Unknown Films". The album was released by private label Rhythm of Life in 2003.

The two previous albums, Cinematique and Cinematique 2 were released in 1991 and 2001 respectively.

Track listing 
 Ice Station X
 Nitemute
 Over Over
 No Place Within
 Speedway
 Electronia
 Milan
 Slinky Android
 Siliconic
 Transportal
 Ecliptic
 Xenogamy
 Find Me
 So Fine
 Contact
 Storm

Paul Haig albums
2003 albums